Deuterotinea longipennis is a moth in the Eriocottidae family. It was described by Nikolay Grigoryevich Erschoff in 1874. It is found in Turkmenistan.

References

Moths described in 1874
Eriocottidae
Insects of Central Asia